Giuseppe Pittau (20 October 1928 – 26 December 2014) was a Roman Catholic titular archbishop.

Born in Villacidro, Italy, Pittau was ordained to the priesthood for the Society of Jesus on 18 March 1959. On 28 July 1998 Pope John Paul II appointed Pittau titular archbishop of Castro di Sardegna and secretary of the Congregation for Catholic Education and Pittau was ordained on 26 September 1998. On 25 November 2003, Pittau retired. Pittau died on Friday 26 December 2014. Before his service in the Congregation for Catholic Education, he had assisted the Jesuit that Pope John Paul II had chosen in the early 1980s, Cardinal Paolo Dezza, S.J., to govern the order following the incapacitation due to a stroke of their then-superior general, Father Pedro Arrupe, S.J. Pope Francis made reference to the services he had rendered in Tokyo and at the Gregorian University, to the Roman Curia, and to the Society of Jesus in the telegram of condolence he sent to the Jesuit superior general, Father Adolfo Nicolas, S.J., upon learning of his death.

Notes

1928 births
2014 deaths
21st-century Italian Roman Catholic titular archbishops
Members of the Congregation for Catholic Education
People from the Province of South Sardinia
20th-century Italian Roman Catholic titular archbishops